The 2013–14 US Open Arena Soccer Championship is the sixth edition of an open knockout style tournament for arena/indoor soccer. In this edition, teams from the Professional Arena Soccer League, Premier Arena Soccer League, and other independent indoor soccer teams are participating in the single elimination tournament.

Unlike a traditional tournament where many teams will gather at a single site to play a series of matches in a short period of time, the US Open Arena Soccer Championship incorporates a series of qualifying tournaments, special matches, and the regular season meetings of teams in the Professional Arena Soccer League over a series of months to fill out then complete the tournament bracket. This non-linear format is how, for example, the Cleveland Freeze advanced to the Semi-finals before the Tulsa Revolution played its weather-delayed Round of 32 match.

After a three-year run by the San Diego Sockers, the 2012–13 Open Cup was won by the Detroit Waza. This year, Detroit was knocked out in its first Open Cup match by the Harrisburg Heat.

Tournament bracket

Western bracket

Eastern bracket

Championship

Confirmed dates and matchups
All times local † Game doubles as regular season or PASL Ron Newman Cup match

Wild Card round
 Sun. Nov. 17th, 5:00pm - Tulsa Tea Men (Independent) 7, Vitesse Dallas (PASL-Premier) 6 (OT)
 Sat. Nov. 23rd, 8:30pm - Yamhill County Crew (PASL-Premier) 8, South Sound Shock (PASL-Premier) 5†
 Sun. Dec. 1st, 2:15pm - AAC Eagles (Independent) 3, Chicago Mustangs Premier (PASL-Premier) 1
 Sun. Dec. 15th, 4:00pm - Ontario Fury (PASL) 8, San Diego Sockers Reserves (PASL-Premier) 5
 FORFEIT - (postponed from Fri. Dec. 6th and again Sun Dec. 22nd due to weather) - Tulsa Revolution (PASL) 3, BH United (Independent) 0 (forfeit)

Round of 32
 Sun. Nov. 17th, 3:00pm - Dallas Sidekicks (PASL) 16, Austin Capitals (PASL-Premier) 5 
 Fri. Dec. 13th, 7:05pm - Bay Area Rosal (PASL) 5, Turlock Express (PASL) 4†
 Sat. Dec. 14th, 7:35pm - AAC Eagles (Independent) 7, Illinois Piasa (PASL) 4
 Thu. Dec. 19th, 7:30pm - (postponed from December 14 due to weather) - Harrisburg Heat (PASL) 9, Real Harrisburg (Independent) 3
 Sat. Dec. 21st, 7:00pm - Sacramento Surge (PASL) 9, Yamhill County Crew (PASL-Premier) 6
 Sun. Dec. 22nd, 2:05pm - Chicago Mustangs (PASL) 3, TOSB FC (Independent) 0 (Forfeit)
 Sat. Dec. 28th, 7:05pm - Wichita B-52s (PASL) 15, Denver Dynamite (PASL-Premier) 6
 Sat. Dec. 28th, 7:05pm - San Diego Sockers (PASL) 13, Ontario Fury (PASL) 5†
 Thu. Jan. 2nd - Las Vegas Legends (PASL) 8, Las Vegas Knights (PASL-Premier) 4
 Sun. Jan. 12th, 10:00am - Tulsa Revolution (PASL) 6, Tulsa Tea Men (Independent) 2 @ Soccer City Tulsa

Round of 16
 Sat. Dec. 14th, 7:05pm - Cleveland Freeze (PASL) 10, Cincinnati Saints (PASL) 6†
 Sat. Dec 21st, 7:05pm - Harrisburg Heat (PASL) 9, Detroit Waza (PASL) 8†1,590
 Sun. Dec. 22nd, 2:05pm - Chicago Mustangs (PASL) 10, A.A.C. Eagles (Independent) 5
 Sat. Dec. 28th, 8:00pm  - Bay Area Rosal (PASL) 9, Sacramento Surge (PASL) 5†
 Sun. Dec. 29th, 5:05pm - Hidalgo La Fiera (PASL) 12, Dallas Sidekicks (PASL) 9†
 Fri. Jan. 3rd, 8:00pm - Austin FC (PASL-Premier) 6, Texas Strikers (PASL) 4 (at Cris Quinn Indoor Soccer Complex, Beaumont TX)
 Sat. Jan 11th, 7:05pm - Las Vegas Legends (PASL) 12, San Diego Sockers (PASL)† 9
 Sat. Jan 25th, 6:05pm - Wichita B-52s (PASL) 10, Tulsa Revolution (PASL) 9†

Quarterfinals
 Sat. Dec. 28th, 7:05pm - Cleveland Freeze (PASL) 12, Harrisburg Heat (PASL) 5†
 Sat. Feb. 1st, 7:05pm -  Chicago Mustangs (PASL) 10, Wichita B-52s (PASL) 5†
 Sat. Feb. 1st, 7:30pm - Hidalgo La Fiera (PASL) 13, Austin FC (PASL-Premier) 2 (at Golazo Arena, Pharr, TX)
 Sun. Feb. 16th, 4:30pm - Las Vegas Legends (PASL) 21, Bay Area Rosal (PASL) 0

Semifinals
 Sat. Feb. 22nd, 4:00pm - Chicago Mustangs (PASL) 15, Cleveland Freeze (PASL) 10
 Sat. Mar. 15th, 5:00pm - Hidalgo La Fiera (PASL) 5, Las Vegas Legends (PASL) 4† (@ Chicago, IL)

Championship
 Sun. Mar. 16th, 4:30pm - Chicago Mustangs (PASL) 14, Hidalgo La Fiera (PASL) 5 †

Qualifying
Green indicates qualification for Qualifying Tournament Knockout Round(s)
Bold Indicates Qualifying Tournament Winner and qualification to US Arena Open Cup
All times local

Harrisburg Qualifying (Oct. 20)

Sunday, October 20, 2013
Group Play
12:00pm- Sporting Club Dover 3, Barcelona 0
12:45pm- Real Harrisburg 9, Deportivo Esperante 1
1:30pm- Harrisburg United 6, Barcelona 3
2:15pm- Real Harrisburg 8, Sporting Club Dover 2
3:00pm- Harrisburg United 6, Deportivo Esperante 1
3:45pm- Real Harrisburg 10, Barcelona 1
4:30pm- Harrisburg United 3, Sporting Club Dover 1
5:15pm- Deportivo Esperante 8, Barcelona 6
6:00pm- Sporting Club Dover 9, Deportivo Esperante 0
6:45pm- Real Harrisburg 5, Harrisburg United 3
Real Harrisburg qualify for US Open Arena Soccer Championships

Illinois Qualifying (Oct. 26-27)

Saturday, October 26, 2013
Group Play
5:00pm- BH United 4, River City Legends 2
5:50pm- Illinois Piasa Premier 4, Illinois Fire 1
7:30pm- River City Legends 6, Illinois Fire 1
5:00pm- BH United 2, Illinois Piasa Premier 1

Sunday, October 27, 2013
Group Play
2:00pm- Illinois Piasa Premier 5, River City Legends 4
2:50pm- BH United 5, Illinois Fire 3

Final
4:15pm- BH United 5, Illinois Piasa Premier 3
BH United qualify for US Open Arena Soccer Championships

South Central Qualifying (Nov. 1-2)

Friday, November 1, 2013
Group Play
9:30pm- Austin FC 2, Austin Gunners 2

Saturday, November 2, 2013
Group Play
1:00pm- Austin Capitals 4, Austin Gunners 3
2:00pm- Texas Strikers Premier 3, Atletico Barcelona 3
6:00pm- Austin FC 6, Atletico Barcelona 3 
6:45pm- Austin Capitals 9, Texas Strikers Premier 4 
7:30pm- Austin Gunners 8, Atletico Barcelona 3
8:15pm- Austin FC 7, Texas Strikers Premier 4 
9:00pm- Austin Capitals 3, Atletico Barcelona 0
9:45pm- Austin Gunners 10, Texas Strikers Premier 3
10:30pm- Austin FC 3, Austin Capitals 1
Austin FC and Austin Capitals qualify for US Open Arena Soccer Championships

Indiana Qualifying (Nov. 2-3)

Saturday, November 2, 2013
Group Play
12:00pm- TOSB FC 15, San Luis FC 1
1:00pm- FC Indiana 10, Fort Wayne Sport Club 1
4:00pm- TOSB FC 3, FC Indiana 2
5:00pm- Fort Wayne Sport Club 10, San Luis FC 3 
8:00pm-  FC Indiana 17, San Luis FC 1 
9:00pm-  TOSB FC 12, Fort Wayne Sport Club 3

Sunday, November 3, 2013
Final 
2:00pm-  TOSB FC 5, FC Indiana 3
TOSB FC qualify for US Open Arena Soccer Championships

Northwest Qualifying (Nov. 23)

Saturday, November 23, 2013
Final (@ Portland, OR)
8:30pm- Yamhill County Crew (PASL-Premier)  8, South Sound Shock (PASL-Premier) 5† 
Yamhill County Crew qualify for US Open Arena Soccer Championships

Las Vegas Qualifying (Nov. 30 - Dec. 1)

Saturday, November 30, 2013
Group Play
Las Vegas Knights 10, Maracana Tucson 1
Juventus LVFC 9, Atlante FC 2 
Las Vegas Knights 5, San Diego Sockers Reserves 4
Juventus LVFC 7, Las Vegas United 1
San Diego Sockers Reserves 7, Maracana Tucson 2
Las Vegas United 14, Atlante FC 2

Quarterfinals
San Diego Sockers Reserves 1, Atlante FC 0
Maracana Tucson 6, Las Vegas United 5

Sunday, December 1, 2013
Semifinals
11:00am- Las Vegas Knights 7, Maracana Tucson 1
11:50am- San Diego Sockers Reserves 7, Juventus LVFC 3

Finals
1:15pm- San Diego Sockers Reserves 6, Las Vegas Knights 5 (SO)
San Diego Sockers Reserves and Las Vegas Knights qualify for US Open Arena Soccer Championships

Chicago Qualifying (Dec. 1)

Sunday, December 1, 2013
Final (@ The Odeum, Villa Park, IL)
2:30pm- AAC Eagles (Independent)  3, Chicago Mustangs Premier (PASL-Premier) 1 
AAC Eagles qualify for US Open Arena Soccer Championships

References

External links
Official website
2013–14 tournament bracket

United States Open Cup for Arena Soccer
United States Open Cup for Arena Soccer
Open Cup for Arena Soccer
Open Cup for Arena Soccer